Network analyzer may mean:

 Packet analyzer, used on a computer data network
 Network analyzer (AC power), an analog computer system used to study electrical power networks
 Network analyzer (electrical), a type of electronic test equipment

See also
 Network management